Óscar "Junior" Benítez (born 14 January 1993) is an Argentine professional footballer who plays as a winger.

Club career
Born in Adrogué, Buenos Aires, Benítez came through the youth system at Club Atlético Lanús, making his senior debut in 2012 aged 19.

On 6 July 2016, Benítez signed a five-year contract with Portuguese champions Benfica. After joining Braga shortly after on a season-long loan deal, he returned to Benfica in January 2017. Two years later, Benítez joined Atlético San Luis on loan until June 2019.

Honours
Lanús
Primera División: 2016
Copa Sudamericana: 2013
Recopa Sudamericana runner-up: 2014
Benfica
Supertaça Cândido de Oliveira: 2016
Boca Juniors
Primera División: 2016–17

References

External links

1993 births
Living people
People from Almirante Brown Partido
Argentine footballers
Association football wingers
Club Atlético Lanús footballers
S.L. Benfica footballers
S.C. Braga players
Boca Juniors footballers
Argentinos Juniors footballers
Atlético San Luis footballers
Delfín S.C. footballers
Atlético Tucumán footballers
Primeira Liga players
Liga MX players
Ecuadorian Serie A players
Argentine expatriate footballers
Expatriate footballers in Portugal
Expatriate footballers in Mexico
Expatriate footballers in Ecuador
Argentine expatriate sportspeople in Portugal
Argentine expatriate sportspeople in Mexico
Argentine expatriate sportspeople in Ecuador
Sportspeople from Buenos Aires Province